WAVH (106.5 MHz, "FM Talk 106-5") is a commercial FM radio station licensed to Daphne, Alabama, and serving the Mobile metropolitan area.  The station airs a talk radio format and is owned by Bigler Broadcasting, LLC.  The studios and offices are located at 900 Western America Circle Suite #106 Interstate 65/Airport Boulevard interchange in Mobile.

WAVH has an effective radiated power (ERP) of 50,000 watts.  The transmitter is on Shelton Beach Road Extension at Pallister Place West in the Beau Terra neighborhood of Mobile.

Programming
FM Talk 1065 airs live local talk shows weekdays from 6 a.m. to 2 p.m.  The station averages 40 hours a week of live, locally produced shows. "Mobile Mornings" with Dan Brennan and Dalton Orwig airs M-F from 6-9 a.m.  Jeff Poor is heard from 9 a.m. till noon.  "Midday Mobile" with Sean Sullivan airs M-F from noon to 2 p.m.  The rest of the weekday schedule features syndicated shows, including Paul Finebaum (sports), Todd Schnitt, Joe Pags, Dana Loesch and This Morning, America's First News with Gordon Deal.

Weekends on FM Talk 1065 feature specialty shows including local home improvement expert Danny Lipford, local high school sports talk with Prep Sports Report, local hunting and fishing talk with FM Talk 1065 Outdoors, South Alabama food and drink talk with Sip and Chew, Plain Gardening on the Gulf Coast with Bill Finch and local golf talk with Randy Burgan and Tee Time. Syndicated weekend shows include Clark Howard, Kim Komando and Free Talk Live.  Most hours begin with world and national news from CBS Radio News.

History

This station received its original construction permit from the Federal Communications Commission on March 5, 1990, originally serving Bay Minette, Alabama.  The new station was assigned the call letters WUIF by the FCC on May 3, 1990.  Just over a month later, on June 4, 1990, the station was assigned new call sign WFMI. The new station began broadcasting a soft adult contemporary music format in mid-1993 under program test authority. The station had the moniker "LiteMix 106.5".

After several extensions, renewals, and changes, WFMI received its license to cover from the FCC on August 25, 1993.  The station was assigned the current WAVH call sign on October 14, 1994.  The FCC authorized WAVH to change its community of license to Daphne, Alabama, on November 29, 1996.

In June 1997, the Baldwin Broadcasting Company reached an agreement to sell this station to American General Media through their AGM-Nevada, LLC, subsidiary.  The deal was approved by the FCC on August 5, 1997, but the transaction was never consummated and control of the station remained with Baldwin Broadcasting.

In November 2000, the Baldwin Broadcasting Company faced financial difficulties and an application was made to transfer control of WAVH to Baldwin Broadcasting Company, Debtor-In-Possession.  The transfer was approved by the FCC on December 8, 2000, and the transaction was consummated on December 12, 2000.

In May 2002, Baldwin Broadcasting Company, Debtor-In-Possession, reached an agreement to sell this station to Cumulus Media through the Cumulus Licensing Corporation subsidiary for a reported $5.11 million.  The deal was never gained FCC approval and the application was dismissed at the request of both parties to the transaction on November 15, 2004. At the time of the announcement, WAVH broadcast an oldies music format.

In March 2007, Baldwin Broadcasting Company, Debtor-In-Possession, reached an agreement to transfer the broadcast license for this station to Barry Wood, doing business as the Baldwin Broadcasting Company.  The deal was approved by the FCC on May 15, 2007, and the transaction was consummated on May 23, 2007.  Just a few months later, in October 2007, Barry Wood reached an agreement to sell this station to Donald Bigler's Bigler Broadcasting, LLC, for a reported $3.6 million.  The deal was approved by the FCC on November 27, 2007, and the transaction was consummated on January 31, 2008.

The station operated as an oldies station called "Oldies 106" until August 2006. The switch was noted by a constant play of Jimmy Buffett songs.  From August 2006 through April 2009, WAVH was an adult hits music formatted station branded as "106.5 The Pirate" with the slogan "70s, 80s, and Whatever We Want!"

The talk format, branded as "FM Talk 106-5", launched on May 1, 2009.

Former Logo

References

External links

AVH
Talk radio stations in the United States
Radio stations established in 1993
1993 establishments in Alabama